Nettoor  (also spelled as Nettur aka Tirunettur) is a region in the city of Kochi. Nettoor is located on Panangad Island and is a part of Maradu Municipality.

Tirunettur Railway Station on Kochi-Alappuzha railway line is situated on the northern end of Nettoor.
Both NH 66 and NH 966B passes through Nettoor.

Location

Education
There are six educational institutions in Nettoor. Saraswati Vilasam Upper Primary (SVUP) school and Raman Master memorial LP school are two schools located here, which are affiliated to the Kerala State Education Board. There are, also, three schools, Mahallu, St. Maria Goretti and Holy Angels public school, which are affiliated to Central Board of Secondary Education (CBSE). Govt. ITI Maradu is situated at Nettoor, near SVUP school and Trika temple.

Healthcare
There are two hospitals at Nettoor – Nettoor Primary Health Centre and Lakeshore Hospital & Research Centre. Nettoor Primary Health Centre has a bed strength of 6. Lakeshore Hospital & Research Centre Ltd. was first set up as a Public Ltd Company in 1996 and opened its doors as a Multi-Super Specialty Hospital in January 2003.

Transport

Road
Nettoor is well connected by roads. Bus services are available to various parts of Kochi, such as Fort Kochi, Edakochi, Thevara, Tripunithura, Vyttila, Kaloor, Edapally, Aluva, Muvattupuzha etc. Bus services are also available to some parts of Alappuzha, such as Cherthala, Aroor, Eramalloor etc. There are KURTC low floor buses available from Nettoor to the Cochin International Airport.

Some of the other nearer bus terminals are Vyttila Mobility Hub (5 km), Ernakulam Jetty KSRTC bus station (9 km), Kaloor private bus terminal (10 km), Mattancherry bus terminus (11 km) and Fort Kochi bus terminal (14 km).

The Kundannoor-Thevara bridge (also known as Kundannoor bridge (on NH 47A)) is the longest bridge in Kerala with a length of 1.74 km (without considering any rail bridges), and passes over the Nettoor railway line and two backwaters. This bridge is the main link between Thevara and Kundannoor.

Rail
The nearest railway station is the Tirunettur railway station, located at the northern part of Nettoor. Other nearby railway stations are Kumbalam railway station (2 km), Tripunithura railway station (5 km) and Ernakulam Junction railway station (5 km).

Air
CIAL handles both domestic and international flights. It is the first international airport in India to be built without Central Government funds.

The Cochin airport provides direct connectivity to popular international destinations in the Middle East, Malaysia and Singapore and to most major Indian cities apart from tourist destinations like Lakshadweep. It is also the fourth busiest airport in India in terms of international passenger traffic, and seventh busiest overall.

Ferry
The distance between Nettoor and Thevara is about 4 km by road. An alternate to this route came into existence since 2012 – Nettoor-Thevara Ferry service. Boat services are available between Nettoor and Thevara, saving about 2.5 km of the journey by roadways. The boat can handle 15 passengers and three two-wheelers. There are about 40 services daily.

Places of Worship

Temples
List of Temples in Nettoor:
Andapallil Devi temple
Arakkal Devi temple
Kallath Sree Krishna temple
Kootungal Devi temple
Kumarapuram Subramania temple
Shanmugapuram Subramania temple
Thattekattu Sri Krishna temple
Thekke Pattupurakkal Devi temple
Tirunettur Mahadeva Temple (known as Trika)
Tirunettur Mahadeva Temple is famous for 'Karkitaka Vavu Bali', a ritual offered for the dead ancestors during the 'Amavasya' or the 'no moon' day of the month of Karkitakam, according to the Malayalam calendar. The main idol of the temple is believed to be installed by the great sage Parashurama. This temple is also believed to be the common temple for all the major Namboothiri families residing in the 32 Namboothiri villages of Kerala. This temple is also known as 'Thekkan Kashi' (English: Southern Kashi).
Vadakke Pattupurakkal Devi temple

Mosques
List of Mosques in Nettoor:
Arafa mosque
Hira Masjid
Masjid Dhool
Masjid Noor mosque
Masjid Ul Himaya mosque
Muhabathil Islam mosque
Nettoor Mahal Juma Masjid
Salafi Juma Masjid
Sayyid Moulal Bukhari memorial Islam mosque
Sirajul Huda mosque

Churches
List of Churches in Nettoor:
Holy Cross Church
Immaculate Heart of Mary Church
St. Antony’s Chapel
St. Jude Chapel
St. Sebastian Church

Banks
There are currently four banks in Nettoor.
Indian Bank
Maradu Service Co-operative Bank
People's Urban Co-operative Bank
Vijaya Bank

Other Landmarks
AVT (P L Lawrence & Co.)
International market
Le Méridien Nettoor
 Bismi Home Appliances Nettoor

References

Suburbs of Kochi